The 2022 South Florida Bulls football team represented the University of South Florida (USF) during the 2022 NCAA Division I FBS football season. The Bulls played their home games at Raymond James Stadium in Tampa, Florida. Third-year head coach Jeff Scott was fired after nine games and a 1–8 start; special teams coordinator Daniel Da Prato finished out the season. This season was the ninth for the Bulls as members of the American Athletic Conference, and their 25th season overall.

The season would prove to be an all-time low for the program. They finished with one win for only the second time in their history (the other being 2020). Also like 2020, they went winless in conference play, and did not win a single game against an FBS opponent. As of 2022, Their 0.083 win percentage for the season is the worst in school history. Jeff Scott went 4-26 during his 3 years as South Florida's head coach with only one win against an FBS opponent, both the worst in school history.

Schedule

Game summaries

BYU

Howard

at Florida

at Louisville

East Carolina

at Cincinnati

Tulane

at Houston

at Temple

SMU

at Tulsa

UCF

Notes

References

South Florida
South Florida Bulls football seasons
South Florida Bulls football